Tusk Trust is a British non-profit organisation set up in 1990 to advance wildlife conservation across Africa. The charity funds the protection of African elephant, African rhinoceros and African lion, along with many other threatened species across Africa. Tusk’s mission is to amplify the impact of progressive conservation initiatives across Africa.

Overview
Tusk Trust was set up by Charles Mayhew MBE, who is the Chief Executive. In 2020, Alexander Rhodes succeeded The Hon Stephen Watson as Chairman of the Tusk Board, which is supported by the Tusk Development Board.

Prince William has been a Royal Patron of the organization since 2005.

Tusk is a member of the Princes' Charities Forum, an initiative started by Prince William and Prince Harry in 2006 as a way of bringing together their charitable interests to develop synergies between the 20 or so organisations they support.

Tusk Trustees 
Alexander Rhodes (Chairman) – Alexander is Head of Purpose at Mishcon de Reya, where he provides strategic Environmental, Social and Governance (ESG) advice. He was the founding CEO of Stop Ivory and head of the Secretariat to the inter-governmental Elephant Protection Initiative. He joined Tusk’s Board in 2014, and was appointed Chairman in 2020.

Other board members are Dr Susan Canney, Sarah Fairbairn, Patrick Harverson, Phillip Ihenacho, Beatrice Karanja, Deborah Meaden, Nick Tims, Nick Maughan, and Mark Tyndall.

Tusk Supported Projects 
Tusk has supported many project across Africa including:

 Big Life Foundation
 Blue Ventures
 Cheetah Conservation Fund
 Conservation Through Public Health
 Grévy's Zebra Trust
 Lewa Wildlife Conservancy
 Lilongwe Wildlife Centre
 Maasai Mara Conservancies
 Okapi Conservation Project 
 Painted Dog Conservation
 Botswana Wild Dog Research Project
 Tsavo Trust
 Honeyguide Foundation

Tusk Conservation Awards 
The Tusk Conservation Awards, in partnership with Ninety-One (formerly Investec Asset Management), is an annual event to celebrate African-based conservation leaders and wildlife rangers, and their significant impacts in the field.

Tusk Trust has presented the annual Tusk Conservation Awards every year in London since 2013.

There are three Tusk Awards presented annually:

 Prince William Award for Conservation in Africa - Sponsored by Ninety One, this is a lifetime achievement award, given to a distinguished individual for their outstanding dedication and exceptional continued contribution to conservation in Africa. Past Winners: Hipólito Lima (2020), Dr. Carlos Lopes Pereira (2019), Pete Morkel (2018), Rian Labuschagne (2017), John Kahekwa (2016), Garth Owen-Smith (2015), Richard Bonham (2014), Clive Stockil (2013).
 Tusk Award for Conservation in Africa - Sponsored by Land Rover, this is for an individual who is judged to be an emerging leading conservationist, in recognition of their outstanding success shown in their chosen field.  Past Winners: John Kamanga (2020), Tomas Diagne (2019), Vincent Opyene (2018), Brighton Kumchedwa (2017), Cathy Dreyer (2016), Dr Emmanuel de Merode (2015), Herizo Andrianandrasana (2014), Tom Lalampaa (2013).
 Tusk Wildlife Ranger Award - Sponsored by The Nick Maughan Foundation, this award gives international recognition to the dedication and commitment of an individual who works in the field to protect Africa’s wildlife.  Past Winners: Amos Gwema (2020), Benson Kanyembo (2019), Julius Obwona (2018), Lucky Ndlovu & Solomon Chidunuka (2017), Manuel Sacaia (2016), Edward Ndiritu (2015).

On 12 September 2013, Prince William and his wife Catherine, Duchess of Cambridge attended the 1st annual Tusk Conservation Awards.

Kate Silverton presented the Tusk Conservation Awards ceremony until 2022.

At the Tusk Conservation Awards 2016 Sir David Attenborough was also honoured for his services to conservation by Prince William.

In 2020, the Tusk Conservation Awards were held online and Prince William was joined by famous faces including host Kate Silverton, Liz Bonnin, Rory Bremner, Ben Fogle, Bear Grylls, Katherine Jenkins, Deborah Meaden, Tristan Phipps, Emma Weymouth and Levison Wood.  The ceremony was accompanied by live music from acoustic artist Jack Savoretti and his band.

In 2022, Tusk celebrated the 10th Anniversary of the Tusk Conservation awards, with Prince William in attendance and presenting the awards to the winners.

Lewa Safari Marathon 
Tusk is co-organiser of the annual Lewa Safari Marathon, an annual fund raising event held at Lewa Downs, about 140 miles (230km) north of Nairobi, Kenya.

Supporters include Eliud Kipchoge and Geoffrey Kamworor.

Tusk Rhino Trail 
The Tusk Rhino Trail was a London-wide art installation held in London between August and September 2018.  It celebrated the magnificence of the rhino, and highlighted the severe threat of poaching to their survival. Each rhino was specially designed, decorated and embellished by internationally renowned artists. The sculptures were on display from 20 August until World Rhino Day on 22 September. They will be auctioned by the leading London auction house, Christie's, on 9 October 2018. The funds raised were to support conservation projects protecting rhino and other endangered African species.

Each rhino was specially designed, decorated and embellished by internationally renowned artists including Glen Baxter, Jake and Dinos Chapman, Eileen Cooper, Adam Dant, Nancy Fouts, Nick Gentry, Zhang Huan, Patrick Hughes, David Mach, Harland Miller, Marc Quinn, Axel Scheffler, Gavin Turk, Dave White, Ronnie Wood, David Yarrow and Jonathan Yeo.

References

External links 

 Tusk  
 Tusk Conservation Awards
 Lewa Safari Marathon
 Wildlife Ranger Challenge 
 Tusk Rhino Trail
 Tusk Symposium
 PACE 
 Living with Wildlife 
 Tusk Trust Limited Charity Commission
 Tusk on YouTube

Elephant conservation organizations
Environmental organisations based in the United Kingdom
1990 establishments in the United Kingdom
Environmental organizations established in 1990